Zinc peroxide (ZnO2) appears as a bright yellow powder at room temperature. It was historically used as a surgical antiseptic. More recently zinc peroxide has also been used as an oxidant in explosives and pyrotechnic mixtures. Its properties have been described as a transition between ionic and covalent peroxides.
Zinc peroxide can be synthesized through the reaction of zinc chloride and hydrogen peroxide.

Preparation
Zinc hydroxide is reacted with a mixture of hydrochloric acid and hydrogen peroxide and precipitated with sodium hydroxide also containing hydrogen peroxide to ensure a higher yield of zinc peroxide. Unlike in the preparation of copper peroxide, the zinc ion does not cause the peroxide to decompose.

Applications
Since the 1930s zinc peroxide has been applied in a variety of settings, from medicine to aesthetics and even fireworks.

Medical Use
The treatment of burrowing ulcers in the abdominal wall with zinc peroxide was first recorded in 1933 and throughout the 1940s ZnO2 was used as a disinfectant in surgical infections.
Zinc peroxide was, however, deemed ineffective against certain bacterial strains, such as Streptococcus viridans, staphylococcus aureus, E. coli, B. proteus, and B. pyocyoneus.  One aspect of the compound’s microorganism toxicity is the resultant stagnation of microbial populations upon administration. This effect was hypothesized to depend upon the compound’s penchant for oxygen donation.  It has been suggested that the increase in oxygen concentration associated with the presence of ZnO2 interferes with the replicative processes of anaerobic and micro-aerophillic organisms, both of which require low oxygen environments for their survival.
While this mechanism was sufficient to explain the stagnation of microbe populations, it did not account for the active reduction in colony size.  As to the microbicidal function, the Zinc ion itself has been postulated to have antibacterial properties, facilitated by the binding of the Zn ion to the bacterial cell wall, which allows for the exertion of cytotoxic effects.  Zinc has been observed to be more effective in the elimination of gram-positive bacteria than gram-negative bacteria.  This difference has been attributed to a difference in the protein composition of the respective cell walls, with the gram-positive wall providing a composition more conducive to binding.

Mineral stain
Recently the compound has found use as a mineral stain for wood and other substances. The mechanism of this action involves the application of a metal salt (such as iron(II) chloride) and the zinc peroxide to the substrate material (wood or wood-like material, i.e. bamboo, paper, cloths, and cellulose products). The metal salt is applied in solution and allowed to dry for up to 30 minutes. Next, zinc peroxide is applied, also in solution. Color change is immediately visible. The two solutions soak into the material, and react, thereby becoming ingrained in the matrix of the substrate.  While these stains can produce a variety of colors ranging from a reddish brown to a yellow hue, they are generally used to mimic the look of endangered wood species in cheaper and more commonly available stock.

Pyrotechnics
In the 1980s the discovery of zinc peroxide’s ability to complement pyrotechnical mixtures was discovered. It was noted that ZnO2 was preferable to the usage of barium compounds, as it was deemed to be less toxic.  The zinc compound proves an effective component in explosives because of its oxidizing properties. Many chemical explosives rely on rapid oxidation reactions, for this reason ZnO2 is an ideal candidate for use in pyrotechnics. Another advantage of ZnO2 was, as compared to the barium and strontium pyroingredients, it effects less corrosion in the metallic materials which contain the compounds in the pyrotechnic instrument.  
In one modality it is necessary for zinc peroxide to act in conjunction with a reducer like calcium silicide, to create the necessary red/ox reaction. In another modality, a ‘secondary’ explosive is mixed with zinc peroxide. Secondary explosives include nitrocellulose, pentaerythritol tetranitrate (PETN), as well as a variety of compounds, like trinitrobenzene, which provide powerful negative charge balance.
These secondary explosives are relatively insensitive to stimuli such as physical impact, heat or charge. The explosive mixture would be comprised, in bulk, of the secondary explosive with a much smaller fraction of zinc peroxide, present to initiate the reaction.

Safety
Zinc peroxide is very hazardous in case of skin contact, of eye contact, or inhalation. Harmful if ingested in large quantities. It has been shown to be corrosive to skin. Prolonged exposure may result in skin burns and ulcerations. Over-exposure by inhalation may cause respiratory irritation. Skin inflammation is characterized by itching, scaling, reddening, or, occasionally, blistering. Zinc peroxide is toxic to lungs and mucous membranes. Repeated or prolonged exposure can produce organ damage. Repeated or prolonged inhalation of vapors may lead to chronic respiratory irritation.

References

Peroxides
peroxide
Oxidizing agents